Lomnica is a village in the municipality of Vrapčište, North Macedonia. It used to be part of Negotino-Pološko Municipality.

History
According to the 1467-68 Ottoman defter, Lomnica appears as being largely inhabited by an Orthodox Christian Albanian population. Due to Slavicisation, some families had a mixed Slav-Albanian anthroponomy - usually a Slavic first name and an Albanian last name or last names with Albanian patronyms and Slavic suffixes. 

The names are: Andreja, son of Gjon; Aleska, his brother; Gjon, son of Lazor; Gjon, son of Leka; Nikolla, son of Matosh; Dabziv, poor; the widow of Gjon; Gjini, son of Petro; Bojk-o, son of Gjon; Luka, son of Gjon; Nikolla, son of Gjergj; Petro, son of Gjerjg; Bogdan, son of Tanush; Nikolla, son of Tanush; Andreja, son of Andre; Stojko, son of Andre; Gjon, son of Niko; Gjuro, son of Niko; Rajk-o, the son of Tano.

Demographics
As of the 2021 census, Lomnica had 118 residents with the following ethnic composition:
Albanians 93
Persons for whom data are taken from administrative sources 25

According to the 2002 census, the village had a total of 574 inhabitants. Ethnic groups in the village include:

Albanians 571
Macedonians 1
Others 2

References

External links

Villages in Vrapčište Municipality
Albanian communities in North Macedonia